The Battle of Alclud Ford was a battle in c.580 at an unknown ford near Alt Clut, the original name for Dumbarton Rock which could also be used for the whole of the kingdom of Strathclyde in modern-day Scotland. It is known from two poems in the Book of Taliesin.

According to Taliesin the Anglian king Ulph "came with violence on his enemies" and was met in battle and killed by Urien map Cynfarch, King of Rheged (probably Cumbria and/or Galloway), and his son Owain mab Urien, as noted in two separate poems. The Bernician attack would have been faced by spear and javelin armed horsemen, who made up the bulk of the Rhegedian warriors, whilst the Bernicians themselves would have primarily consisted of infantry as was the standard for Anglo-Saxon warriors of the period. Ulph was probably one of the sons of King Ida of Bernicia, most likely Theodulf, which puts the battle at c.574 or c.590, or potentially Frithuwolf, also known as Freothulf or Frithuwald, which would put the Alclud Ford at c.580.

The battle was fought at a time when Rheged was at its ascendancy, and the armies under Urien and Owain were the most powerful in the north.

References

580
580s conflicts
Alclud Ford
Alclud Ford
Alclud Ford
History of West Dunbartonshire
6th century in Scotland
Taliesin